The 2015–16 Alabama State Hornets basketball team represented Alabama State University during the 2015–16 NCAA Division I men's basketball season. The Hornets, led by 11th-year head coach Lewis Jackson, played their home games at the Dunn–Oliver Acadome as members of the Southwestern Athletic Conference. They finished the season 14–17, 9–9 in SWAC play to finish in fifth place. They lost in the quarterfinals of the SWAC tournament to Southern.

Roster

Schedule and results
Source: 

|-
!colspan=8 style="background:#000000; color:#FFD700;"| Exhibition

|-
!colspan=8 style="background:#000000; color:#FFD700;"| Regular season

|-
!colspan=9 style="background:#000000; color:#FFD700;"|SWAC regular season

|-
!colspan=8 style="background:#000000; color:#FFD700;"| SWAC tournament

References

Alabama State
Alabama State Hornets basketball seasons
Alabama State Hornets basketball
Alabama State Hornets basketball